is a Japanese Tokusatsu series produced by Tsuburaya Productions and Chubu-Nippon Broadcasting Co., Ltd. Released as the 19th Ultra Series, it aired from July 2, 2005, until April 1, 2006. The show aimed to return to the fast-paced formula of encountering a new monster each week, similar to the previous series, with the exception of Ultraman Nexus. On October 10, 2014, Crunchyroll announced that the series would be broadcast on their streaming service starting on October 17, 2014, in the US, Canada, Latin America, UK, Australia, and New Zealand.

On January 27, 2017, the US television channel TOKU announced that the series would be broadcast in the United States on its channel with an English dub beginning February 27, 2017, making it the fifth Ultra Series to air in the United States after Ultraman, Ultra Seven, Ultraman: Towards the Future (originally in English without a Japanese dub) and Ultraman Tiga.

Synopsis

In the 21st century, multiple phenomena begin to occur as monsters who were initially thought to be a part of mythology come to life. These phenomena resulted from human activities that disrupted the nature of the ecosystem.

Touma Kaito dreamed of entering DASH because previously he was a volunteer who often rescued people from natural disasters. However, he failed the entrance test because he was considered too hot-spirited when trying to protect people without thinking and often unconsciously doing excessive actions that endanger his safety. Kaito still insists on getting into DASH. When he was still an apprentice, Touma recklessly replaces one of the wounded DASH members to help dispel the monster to avoid heavy casualties. At a critical moment, Touma bonded with Ultraman Max to save his life and fought the incoming monster on his own.

After being accepted into DASH, Kaito and Max had been teaming up to defend Earth from various monsters and alien threats. In the middle of the series, Max was saved from Zetton by Ultraman Xenon, who gives him the Max Galaxy to even the odds: the device is added to his arsenal since then. In the final episode, the underground civilization Delos began their invasion of the surface after years of suffering from the negative effects to their civilization. Max initially backed away from the fight due to his race's policy of not interfering with civil wars until Kaito's determination changed both the minds of  Ultraman and Delos, the latter of whom begged their doomsday weapon Giga Berserker to be stopped. Max was initially killed saving Kaito until DASH members revive him with enough sunlight to destroy Giga Berserker.

The Ultraman left Earth years later, and the elderly Kaito and Mizuki watched their grandchildren departing to space as Earth has finally entered a peaceful coexistence with other races.

Episodes

Super Battle Special
After the broadcast of Ultraman Max, an eight-minute special was released on DVD. This special was a five-minute clip show giving a review of Ultraman Max's back-story and primary attacks up until Ultraman Xenon gives him the Max Galaxy. After the clip show, the monster Red King attacks Max with Zetton shortly joining in. The special ends with Max defeating both of them.

Cast
: 
: 
: 
: 
: 
: 
: 
: 
: 
Narrator:

Guest cast
: 
: 
: 
: 
: 
: 
: 
: 
: 
: 
: 
: 
: 
: 
: 
: 
Security Guard (33):  
Unnamed police officer (33, 34): 
Evacuee (36):

Songs
Opening theme

Lyrics: 
Composition & Arrangement: 
Artist: TEAM DASH with Project DMM

Insert songs
"NO LIMITED"
Lyrics, Composition, & Arrangement: 
Artist: Project DMM
"Ultra miracle"
Lyrics, composition, arrangement: Daimon Kazuya 
Artist: Project DMM
"NOT SO BAD" 
Lyrics and composition: Yoshihiro Takahashi 
Arrangement: ACTION 
Artist: BAD SCANNERS (ACTION)
"Goodbye song"
Arrangement: Kuniaki Kuwashima
"Chocho"
Arrangement: Toru Fuyuki 
Artist: Yukari Oshima
"Red Dragonfly"
Arrangement: Toru Fuyuki 
Artist: Yukari Oshima
"TO THE MAX"
Artist: Project DMM

Home media
In July 2020, Shout! Factory announced to have struck a multi-year deal with Alliance Entertainment and Mill Creek, with the blessings of Tsuburaya and Indigo, that granted them the exclusive SVOD and AVOD digital rights to the Ultra series and films (1,100 TV episodes and 20 films) acquired by Mill Creek the previous year. Ultraman Max, amongst other titles, will stream in the United States and Canada through Shout! Factory TV and Tokushoutsu.

The series is scheduled to be released in the United States on DVD January 22, 2023 by Mill Creek Entertainment.

References

External links
 Official site
 
 Crunchyroll page

2005 Japanese television series debuts
2006 Japanese television series endings
Ultra television series